Sarsfield Lake is a small lake in Lee Township, Timiskaming District, in northeastern Ontario, Canada. The lake is in the James Bay drainage basin and the nearest community is Sesekinika,  to the east.

The primary inflow, at the south, is Sarsfield Creek arriving from Gould Lake. The primary outflow, at the north, is also Sarsfield Creek, which heads north. Sarsfield Creek flows via Meyers Lake, Woollings Creek, the Whiteclay River, the Black River, the Abitibi River and the Moose River to James Bay.

References

Other map sources:

Lakes of Timiskaming District